Andranomiely Sud (also called: Andranomiely Atsimo) is a village in Analamanga Region, in the  Central Highlands of Madagascar, located north-west from the capital of Antananarivo.

References
mindat.org

Populated places in Analamanga